Bohicon or Gbohikon is a city in Benin, and a conurbation of Abomey lying 9 kilometres east of the city on the railway line from Cotonou to Parakou and on Benin's main highway RNIE 2 which joins the RNIE 4. The commune covers an area of 139 square kilometres and as of 2012 had a population of 149,271 people.

A speciality sold in the market is afitin (soy dawa-dawa/soy iru), which is traditionally and somewhat famously in Benin made by women in the region. It is a protein-rich fermented food widely used in West Africa as a seasoning.

Climate
Bohicon has a rather dry tropical savanna climate (Köppen Aw) with a lengthy though moderate wet season from March to October and a short dry season from November to February. The wet season divides into two periods: a hotter first half from March to June and a cooler, foggy second half somewhat influenced by the northern extension of the Benguela Current.

Administration

Bohicon is one of the 77 official Communes of Benin. The city is located 9 kilometres from Abomey but the commune is divided into arrondissements:

Bohicon 1
Bohicon 2
Sdohomé
Saclo
Passangon
Ouassaho
Lissezoun
Gnidjazoun
Avogbana
Agongointo

Notable landmarks

Lycée Technique de Bohicon (LYTEB)
Collège Monseigneur Steinmetz
Bohicon Railway Station
Parc Archeologique d'Agongointo

Notable people

Nicéphore Dieu-Donné Soglo - former President of Benin
Hubert Maga - Born in Parakou but studied in Bohicon.
Abraham Zinzindohoue - former Benin Minister of Justice
Ben La Desh - Musician from Rotterdam but born in Bohicon.
Jonas Lekpa - Famous marabout living in Bohicon.

References

External links 

 Bohicon

Communes of Benin
Arrondissements of Benin
Populated places in the Zou Department